Anthony Denny (1807 - 1890) was Archdeacon of Ardfert from 1861 to 1885.

The son of Sir Edward Denny, 3rd Baronet, M.P. for Tralee he was educated at Trinity College, Dublin.  He was the Incumbent at Tralee from 1831 until 1861; and at Kilgobbin from 1862 until 1895.

References

Alumni of Trinity College Dublin
Archdeacons of Ardfert
1807 births
1890 deaths
Clergy from County Kerry
Diocese of Limerick, Ardfert and Aghadoe